Poproč ([pronunciation: 'poproch]) is a village in eastern Slovakia near the town of Košice.

The first written mention about the locality is dated back to 1255 - Poproč is mentioned in the document of the King Béla IV as the royal mining settlement Olchuan.

In the year 2005, Poproč celebrated the 750th anniversary of the first written mention about the village. There were born 15 children (7 boys and 8 girls) in 2005, 32 inhabitants died, 18 moved away from Poproč and 32 inhabitants moved in.

Some of the historical names of Poproč

 1255 - Olchuan, Elchuan or Elchwan (Latin)
 1383 - Medzenth
 1407 - Mendzenth
 1427 - Menthzenth
 1481 - Myndzenth
 1590 - Podprocz aliter Myndzenth
 1596 - Mindzenth
 1773 - Mind. Szent (Hungarian)
 1808 - Podproč (Slovak), Jászo-Mindszent (H)
 1851 - Podproch
 1903 - Poproč (SK), Jászómindszent (H)

Statistics

 Area: 26.7 km2
 Population: 2,780 (up to Dec. 31, 2005)
 Density of population: 104/km2
 District: Košice-okolie
 Mayor: Ing. Štefan Jaklovský

Notable people
Ladislav Štovčík, footballer

External links
 Official website of Poproč (in Slovak)

Villages and municipalities in Košice-okolie District